The Fire Alarm is a 1936 Looney Tunes animated cartoon directed by Jack King. It features Ham and Ex, who are spotted St. Bernard puppies, in their only film as star characters, and also co-starring their Uncle Beans.

Plot
Ham and Ex have been sent to the fire station by their mother Lizzie so Uncle Beans can babysit them. Ham and Ex have an ambition of becoming firefighters and play around with their uncle's fire engine and equipment. Annoyed by their fiddling around, Beans has them seated on a bench, but when his back is turned, Ham and Ex accidentally set off the fire alarm, waking the other firemen, only to realize on their return it was a false alarm.

Beans has Ham and Ex grounded in the sleeping quarters. Once he's left, Ham and Ex jump out of their beds and down the fire pole. Then they get in the fire engine and drive off through the station wall into the street, to Beans' horror. Beans runs after them as they clumsily crash and bump their way around the city. Finally they drive back to the station and hop back into bed just as Beans returns. He notices they appear to be asleep before he can belt them. As Beans exits the room, Ham and Ex toss a fireman's boot at him. Entirely fed up with their bad behavior, Beans drags them to one end of the bed and spanks them.

See also
 Looney Tunes and Merrie Melodies filmography (1929–1939)

References

External links
 
 

1936 films
1936 animated films
American black-and-white films
Films scored by Norman Spencer (composer)
Films directed by Jack King
Looney Tunes shorts
Warner Bros. Cartoons animated short films
Beans the Cat films
Animated films about dogs
Animated films about cats
Films about firefighting
1930s Warner Bros. animated short films